Conception Bay is a bay on the coast of Namibia, Africa. The bay is exposed, not providing a useful anchorage.

Geography
Conception Bay opens to the Atlantic Ocean in the northwest. There is a lagoon at the southern edge of its shoreline. The bay is located in a desolate area. It is part of one of the coastal stretches of Namibia where diamonds are found.

Shipwrecks
She broke up over the following weeks and was a complete wreck by early September.

See also
 Geography of Namibia
 Eduard Bohlen

References

External links
 Karte des Küstengebietes zwischen Hottentottenbucht und Empfängnisbucht
Deutsch-Südwestafrika: Funkentelegrafie Empfängnisbucht

Bays of Namibia